Oglinda ("The Mirror"), also known as Începutul adevărului ("The Beginning of Truth"), is a controversial 1993 film by Romanian director Sergiu Nicolaescu. It depicts Romania during World War II, focusing on the Royal Coup of 23 August 1944 that toppled Ion Antonescu, the Axis-allied Conducător and authoritarian Prime Minister.

Cast
 as Ion Antonescu
 as Michael I of Romania
Gheorghe Dinică as Mihai Antonescu
 as Iuliu Maniu
George Constantin as Andrey Vyshinsky
Sergiu Nicolaescu as Johannes Frießner
 as Adolf Hitler
Peter Wolf Joachim as Joachim von Ribbentrop
Șerban Ionescu as Lucrețiu Pătrășcanu
George Alexandru as 
 as Mircea Ionnițiu
Ștefan Iordache as Eugen Cristescu
Dorel Vișan as Petru Groza
Mitică Popescu as Dumitru Săracu
Emil Hossu as Colonel 
Ion Lupu as General Constantin Sănătescu
Vladimir Găitan as Dinu Brătianu
 as 
Iurie Darie as Iorgu Ghica
 as SS-Standartenführer 
 as Gheorghe Brătianu
 as Marshal Fyodor Tolbukhin
 as Maria Antonescu
Olga Bucătaru as Queen Mother Helen
 as Baron Manfred von Killinger
Liviu Crăciun as General Aurel Aldea
Traian Stănescu as Constantin Titel Petrescu
Petru Moraru as Teohari Georgescu
 as Gheorghe Gheorghiu-Dej
 as Corneliu Coposu
Paul Ioachim
 as Gheorghe Pintilie
Constantin Drăgănescu as Intelligence Service agent
Virgil Popovici — General

Reactions
The film was criticized as being apologetic of Antonescu, whom it portrays as a martyr figure, without mention being made of his complicity in the Holocaust (see Holocaust in Romania). Oglinda is also sympathetic to Antonescu's Nazi German ally Adolf Hitler, who is depicted as a calm and wise politician. Nicolaescu himself claims that journalist Octavian Paler labeled it a "fascist film".

The film was also criticized for several other errors. Historian and former public servant Neagu Djuvara, who in 1944 represented Antonescu's government to Stockholm, where he contacted the Soviet Union representative Alexandra Kollontai and unsuccessfully negotiated an armistice, rejected the film's allusive take on these events, which claimed that Romania's special requests had been ignored by their counterparts, and called it "a lie". According to Sergiu Nicolaescu, former King of Romania Michael I, the main decision factor behind Antonescu's deposition, objected to his character being depicted as a heavy smoker. Speaking in 2008, Djuvara criticized Oglinda in its entirety for mystification, while expressing similar reserves in respect to Nicolaescu's 2008 project, a biographical film on Michael's ancestor, Carol I of Romania (Carol I).

Nicolaescu's 1993 production received negative assessments from several film critics. As part of his commentary on Nicolaescu's entire filmography, beginning with films he produced under the communist regime, Valerian Sava depicted Nicolaescu as an untalented director caught in a "megalomaniac trance", and deemed Oglinda "a rudimentary historical reenactment".

Nicolaescu defended his film, claiming that its critics were "afraid to look in the face of history." He referred to Oglinda as "real history, without any form of restriction", and "the first and only Romanian political film." He also maintained that Corneliu Coposu, a first-hand witness to the events, applauded the film upon its premiere.

References

External links
 

Films directed by Sergiu Nicolaescu
Political drama films
Romanian World War II films
1990s Romanian-language films
1993 films
1993 drama films
Romanian historical films